Wrong Planet (sometimes referred to by its URL, wrongplanet.net) is an online community for "individuals (and parents / professionals of those) with Autism, Asperger's Syndrome, ADHD, PDDs, and other neurological differences". The site was started in 2004 by Dan Grover and Alex Plank and includes a chatroom, a forum, and articles describing how to deal with daily issues.  Wrong Planet has been referenced by the mainstream U.S. media.  Wrong Planet comes up in the special education curriculum of many universities in the United States. A page is dedicated to Wrong Planet and its founder in Exceptional Learners: Introduction to Special Education.

History
In 2006, Alex Plank was sued by the victims of a 19-year-old member of the site, William Freund, who shot two people (and himself) in Aliso Viejo, California, after openly telling others on the site that he planned to do so.

In 2007, a man who was accused of murdering his dermatologist posted on the site while eluding the police. Wrong Planet was covered in a Dateline NBC report on the incident.

In 2008, Wrong Planet began getting involved in autism self-advocacy, with the goal intended to further the rights of autistic individuals living in the United States. Alex Plank, representing the site, testified at the Health and Human Services's Interagency Autism Coordinating Committee.

In 2010, Wrong Planet created a television show about autism called Autism Talk TV. Sponsors of this web series include Autism Speaks.  The show is hosted by Alex Plank and Jack Robison, the son of author John Elder Robison. Neurodiversity advocates have accused Plank of betraying Wrong Planet's goal for autism acceptance by accepting money from Autism Speaks for this web series.

References

External links 
 
 

Online support groups
Mental health support groups
Autism-related organizations in the United States
Internet forums
American health websites
Internet properties established in 2004
Companies based in Fairfax, Virginia
Disability mass media
Blog hosting services
2004 establishments in Virginia
Mental health organizations in Virginia